The 1978 Mercedes Cup, was a men's tennis tournament played on outdoor clay courts and held at the Tennis Club Weissenhof in Stuttgart, West Germany that was part of the 1978 Grand Prix circuit. It was the inaugural edition of the tournament and was held from 17 July until 23 July 1978. Unseeded Ulrich Pinner won the singles title.

Finals

Singles
 Ulrich Pinner defeated  Kim Warwick, 6–2, 6–2, 7–6
 It was Pinner's first singles title of his career.

Doubles
 Tomáš Šmíd /  Jan Kodeš defeated  Carlos Kirmayr /  Belus Prajoux, 6–3, 7–6

References

External links
 Official website 
 ATP tournament profile

Stuttgart Open
Stuttgart Open
Stuttgart Open
Stuttgart Open